Tevaitoa is an associated commune on the island of Raiatea, in French Polynesia. It is part of the commune Tumaraa. According to the 2017 census, it had grown to a population 1,939 people.

References

Raiatea
Populated places in the Society Islands